Dr. Henry's Emergency Lessons for People (a.k.a. H.E.L.P.! — Dr. Henry's Emergency Lessons for People) is a series of animated television shorts that served as public service announcements, aimed at children. Created and produced by writer and lyricist Lynn Ahrens and named for and inspired by the work of contributor Dr. Henry Heimlich, these one-minute shorts which debuted during the 1979–1980 television season. They were broadcast throughout the early 1980s in the US on ABC during commercial breaks on Saturday mornings when youngsters were tuned in to Saturday morning cartoons and similar children's programming. H.E.L.P.! won an Emmy Award in 1980.

Each short presents a central character experiencing a minor injury and the proper way to initially handle care for it. First aid was demonstrated for practical purposes.

Eight shorts were created.

References

External links
 

1970s American animated television series
1980s American animated television series
1979 American television series debuts
1980 American television series endings
American children's animated education television series
Interstitial television shows